The Islamic Labour Movement in Iraq is a political party in Iraq. 
At the legislative elections, 31 January 2005, the party won 0.5% of the popular vote and 2 out of 275 seats.

Islamic political parties in Iraq
Labour parties